Trilled affricates, also known as post-trilled consonants, are consonants which begin as a stop and have a trill release. These consonants are reported to exist in some Northern Paman languages in Australia, as well as in some Chapacuran languages such Wariʼ language and Austronesian languages such as Fijian and Malagasy.

In Fijian, trilling is rare in these sounds, and they are frequently distinguished by being postalveolar. In Malagasy, they may have a rhotic release, be simple stops, or standard affricates, .

Most post-trilled consonants are affricates: the stop and trill share the same place of articulation. However, there is a rare exception in a few neighboring Amazonian languages, where a voiceless bilabially post-trilled dental stop,  (occasionally written ) is reported from Pirahã and from a few words in the Chapacuran languages Wariʼ and Oro Win. This sound also appears as an allophone of the labialized voiceless alveolar stop  of Abkhaz and Ubykh, but in those languages it is more often realised by a doubly articulated stop .

Hydaburg Haida  is cognate to Southern Haida , Masset Haida .

References

Trill consonants
Affricates